Siti Aisyah We Tenriolle was the Queen ("Datu") regnant of the Kingdom of Tanete, South Sulawesi from 1855-1910.

Her birth date is unknown. She died in 1919, in the village of Pancana Tanette ri Lau.

Siti Aisyah We Tenriolle helped to emancipate the women leaders from the tribe of Bugis, Tanete Sand South Sulawesi, Indonesia while serving as queen. Siti Aisyah We Tenriolle also controlled the Kingdom of Bugis. A major contribution of Siti Aisyah We Tenriolle was translating the epic piece La Galigo from the ancient Buginese language.

References

History of Sulawesi
19th-century women rulers
20th-century women rulers
Indonesian monarchs
19th-century monarchs in Asia
1919 deaths
Year of birth unknown
20th-century monarchs in Asia